Five ships of the Royal Navy have borne the name HMS Electra, after the Greek mythological figure, Electra:

 was a 16-gun brig-sloop launched in 1806 and wrecked in 1808.
 was a 16-gun brig-sloop, previously the French Espiegle. She was captured in 1808 by HMS Sybille and was sold in 1816.
 was an 18-gun sloop launched in 1837 and sold in 1862.
 was a  launched in 1896 and reclassified as a C-class destroyer in 1913.  She was sold for scrapping in 1920. 
 was an E-class destroyer launched in 1934 and sunk in 1942.

Royal Navy ship names